Aagje ("Ada") Kok (born 6 June 1947, in Amsterdam, North Holland) is a former Dutch swimmer who ranked among the world's best in the butterfly stroke category during the 1960s.

Her international career started in 1962 when, at the age of fifteen, she took the European title in the 100 m butterfly in Leipzig. She was also part of the silver 4×100 m medley relay team. At the Tokyo Olympics two years later she finished second in both events. She was also good at freestyle swimming, which showed when she took second place in the 400 metres at the 1966 European Championships in Utrecht. In the same tournament she also won the 100 m butterfly and the 4×100 m relay. She achieved nine world records between 1963 and 1967 in the 100 m and 200 m (not introduced until later).

Kok reached her peak at the 1968 Summer Olympics in Mexico City. She won the gold medal in the 200 meter butterfly race in a time of 2:24.7, beating the East German Helga Lindner by 0.1 seconds. The 100 meter butterfly race in that Olympic Games ended in disappointment for her, when she did not feel well beforehand, and finished in  fourth place..

In her memoirs written by Henk Lichtenveldt, she stated:

See also
 List of members of the International Swimming Hall of Fame
 World record progression 100 metres butterfly
 World record progression 200 metres butterfly

References
 Dutch Olympic Committee

1947 births
Living people
Dutch female butterfly swimmers
Dutch female freestyle swimmers
World record setters in swimming
Olympic gold medalists for the Netherlands
Olympic silver medalists for the Netherlands
Olympic swimmers of the Netherlands
Swimmers from Amsterdam
Swimmers at the 1964 Summer Olympics
Swimmers at the 1968 Summer Olympics
Medalists at the 1964 Summer Olympics
Medalists at the 1968 Summer Olympics
European Aquatics Championships medalists in swimming
Olympic gold medalists in swimming
Olympic silver medalists in swimming
People from Hulsberg
Sportspeople from Limburg (Netherlands)
20th-century Dutch women